"Finances with Wolves" is the eleventh episode of the second season and the eighteenth overall episode of the animated comedy series American Dad!. It aired on Fox in the United States on January 29, 2006, and is written by Neal Boushell and Sam O'Neal and directed by Albert Calleros.

In the episode, despite Stan's objections, Francine realizes a long-standing dream of opening a kiosk at the Langley Falls Mall to sell her muffins, while Hayley becomes an eco-warrior to fight the mall's expansion. Meanwhile, Stan decides to give Klaus a new human body so Klaus can cook for him; and Steve thinks he's a werewolf.

Plot
After receiving a hefty bonus from work, Stan buys extravagant gadgets while Francine pleads for her dream kiosk at the mall. Upset about his lack of support, Francine opens a muffin shop without his approval and gives Stan a taste of life without a housewife. In a desperate move, Stan puts Klaus' brain back into a human body - that of the frontman of an Earth, Wind & Fire cover band who was abducted by the CIA in retaliation for ripping them off at the summer mixer - thinking that Klaus will cook breakfast for him only to discover it was a huge mistake as Klaus takes Stan hostage, steals Stan's cash and then gets rid of his former goldfish body by flushing it down the toilet. Klaus then sets out to win over Francine. Meanwhile, Steve is convinced he's a teen werewolf after watching a horror film and being attacked randomly by a wolf. In actuality, Roger adopted a wolf from the woods (after accidentily killing his sea monkeys), named it "Felicity" and, in the night, it killed another animal and covered Steve's room with blood. Another night, Steve and his friends go into the woods for his friends to kill him with a silver bullet; the actual wolf shows up and, in a confusing situation, they wind up thinking a silver bullet restored Steve to his normal self and separated the wolf from his body.

Klaus, after some quick preparations, seduces Francine at the mall before Stan arrives, revealing the ruse; but an eco-terrorist friend of Hayley sets off a series of bombs, blowing up a statue of Chief Shop-a-holic in the mall. Klaus dives out of the way to protect his new body; Stan, however, pushes Francine out of the way, but the statue piece hits his clock necklace of Stan's, ruining it but keeping Francine and Stan safe. Hayley's eco-terrorist friend is then placed under arrest. Francine becomes proud that Stan had saved her, and they reconcile. Klaus' body is half-crushed by a large piece of the statue, and near death he pleads with Stan to save his life. Francine also pleads with Stan to save Klaus' life, thinking he has learned his lesson about attempting adultery. Stan says the CIA has no more abducted people, so he purchases a goldfish from the mall pet shop and places Klaus' mind in it to save his life.

Reception
Ryan Budke of AOL TV gave the episode a negative review, saying "Ever wondered what Klaus the goldfish would look like as a black man? Neither did I, but I had never really been posed that question before. I think if someone asked me that I would have wondered... Well, whether you've had those sick thoughts before or not, you got the answer to that question during last night's episode of American Dad. I have a feeling that American Dad is hitting it's stride, which is probably not a good thing. The show is going ok, but it's nothing spectacular, and far, far short of its potential. It's always going to be the second banana to Family Guy. It's not a bad show by any means, but American Dad will never be as good as Family Guy. On with the show!" Daniel Solomon of Cinema Blend gave the episode a mixed review, saying "This is the only time in the series where I was not angered to the point of cutting myself by Roger’s annoying shtick. In this case he is an alien is used in a purely non-Stewie way, as he fails to realize that wolves are dangerous creatures. In addition, the most ingenious line in the entire series is uttered here. Stan, in response to his wife opening her own business, says: “What kind of businesswoman forgets to make dinner for her husband? That’s bad business. And bad womaning.” If you don’t think misogyny is funny at all, this show is not for you. But I’m sure there’s a poetry slam going on somewhere." The episode was watched by a total of 8.23 million people; this made it the third most watched show on Animation Domination that night, beating King of the Hill but losing to The Simpsons and Family Guy, which had 9.08 million.

References

External links 
 

2006 American television episodes
American Dad! (season 2) episodes
Fiction about body swapping